Er Pukhraj Garg is Indian politician. He is a member of the Rajasthan Legislative Assembly from the Rashtriya Loktantrik Party representing the Bhopalgarh Vidhan sabha Constituency in Rajasthan from 2018.

References 

Living people
Members of the Rajasthan Legislative Assembly
Rashtriya Loktantrik Party politicians
People from Jodhpur district
Year of birth missing (living people)
Bharatiya Janata Party politicians from Rajasthan